Astronidium tomentosum is a species of plant in the family Melastomataceae. It is endemic to Fiji.

References

Endemic flora of Fiji
tomentosum
Near threatened plants
Taxonomy articles created by Polbot